Darcey Steinke (born April 25, 1962) is an American author and educator. She has written five novels: Up Through the Water, Suicide Blonde, Jesus Saves, and Milk, Easter Everywhere, and Sister Golden Hair. Steinke has also served as a lecturer at Princeton University, the American University of Paris, New School University, Barnard College, the University of Mississippi, and Columbia University.

Early life
Steinke, born in Oneida, New York, on April 25, 1962, is the daughter of a Lutheran minister. Steinke grew up in upstate New York; Connecticut; Philadelphia; and Roanoke, Virginia.

She is a graduate of Cave Spring High School, Goucher College, and the University of Virginia, where she received a Master of Fine Arts in creative writing. Steinke completed a Stegner Fellowship at Stanford University.

Career

Writing
She is the author of four novels, Up Through the Water, Suicide Blonde, Jesus Saves, and Milk, and the spiritual memoir Easter Everywhere. Her fifth novel, Sister Golden Hair, was published by Tin House Books in October 2014. Steinke co-edited the collection of essays Joyful Noise:  The New Testament Revisited with Rick Moody. Steinke has written extensively on art and literature and has contributed to Spin Magazine, covering the David Koresh Branch Davidian story and contributing a 1993 cover story on Kurt Cobain. In addition, she has a web project called blindspot which was part of the Whitney Biennial in 2000. Her novels Up Through the Water and Jesus Saves were selected as New York Times Notable Books of the Year.

Steinke's prose has been said to "repeatedly hint at the divine in tangible things." According to a The Washington Post book review of Steinke's novel Milk, "Steinke writes some beautifully mystical descriptions of sexual encounters, and the conjunction of sex and the spirit, bodies and souls, is fascinating."

Steinke's writing has appeared in The New York Times Magazine, The Boston Review, Vogue, Spin Magazine, The Washington Post, Chicago Tribune, and The Guardian.

Teaching
Steinke teaches creative writing at Princeton University and the American University of Paris and in the graduate programs at New School University and Columbia University. She previously taught at the University of Mississippi, where she was a writer-in-residence, and at Barnard College.

Personal life
Steinke married journalist Michael Hudson in June 2009. It is her second marriage after writer Michael Hornburg. Steinke lives in Brooklyn with her husband and daughter, Abbie. Steinke played guitar in the New York-based rock band Ruffian. Her cousin Rene Steinke is also an author. She has written about how her struggles with a stutter contributed to her writing career.

Bibliography

Fiction 

Up Through the Water (1989)
Suicide Blonde (1992)
Jesus Saves (1999)
Milk (2005) Bloomsbury Publishing
Sister Golden Hair (October 2014) Tin House Books

Nonfiction 

 Joyful Noise: The New Testament Revisited (co-editor, with Rick Moody, and contributor) (1997)
 Easter Everywhere (2007) (memoir)
 Flash Count Diary: Menopause and the Vindication of Natural Life (2019)
• "God Is In The House" (2020), an essay about         the musician & songwriter Nick Cave, contained in his book "Stranger Than Kindness" (Canongate), published in association with Stranger Than Kindness: The Nick Cave Exhibition, Royal Danish Library, Copenhagen, March 23 – October 3, 2020

References

External links
 Official website
  Nirvana: 'In Utero' Cover Story (SPIN Magazine)
 Writer-Rocker Darcey Steinke Downs Jell-O With Nuns (Grub Street)
 Meeting Kurt Cobain: One Writer's Story, 20 Years Later
 New York Times review of Easter Everywhere

American women novelists
Goucher College alumni
Living people
American memoirists
University of Virginia alumni
1962 births
Novelists from Virginia
Goddard College faculty
The New School faculty
Columbia University faculty
University of Mississippi faculty
Barnard College faculty
20th-century American novelists
American women memoirists
20th-century American women writers
21st-century American novelists
21st-century American women writers
Novelists from New York (state)
Novelists from Mississippi
Novelists from Vermont
20th-century American non-fiction writers
21st-century American non-fiction writers
American women academics